Sashabaw Presbyterian Church is a historic church located at 5331 Maybee Road near Clarkston, Michigan. The church is one of the oldest in the Detroit Presbytery and has served congregations for nearly 150 years. It was designated a Michigan State Historic Site in 1964 and listed on the National Register of Historic Places in 1980.

History
In 1840, a local congregation was organized as a mission of the First Presbyterian Church in Pontiac. A schism soon resulted in the formation of the Church of Orion and Independence, which met in local schools.  On January 20, 1855, the congregation organized a church-building society organized for the purpose of erecting a new church.   The society chose Pratt & Tuttle as contractors, and the congregation changed its name to the "First Presbyterian of Independence Township." A lot for construction was purchased, and the building was completed in 1856 for a total cost (including furnishings) of $3000.  In 1917-18, the church was renovated, replacing the foundation and removing the steeple.

However, the church congregation remained small, and in 1932 it was dissolved. In 1946, the Sashabaw United Presbyterian Church was organized and began using this building as its home. In 1952, the church was lifted, and a new foundation with a basement laid.  In 1958, the steeple and belfry, removed in 1917-18, were replaced. In the 1960s, a new meeting house was constructed nearby for the congregation, and the congregation moved there for worship services in the 1970s.

Today
The 1856 church is currently used by the Sashabaw Presbyterian Church (USA).  In 2012 a workshop in window restoration was held in conjunction with the DAR and Clarkston Historical Society.  The building is currently used by the churches theater ministry and special worship services.

Description
The Sashabaw Presbyterian Church is a small rectangular-plan Greek Revival clad in clapboard siding.  It has a gable roof with flush-boarded pedimented treatment within the gable, sixteen-over-sixteen sash windows, and a small 1957 steeple.  A rear addition is connected to the church.

References

External links
Official church website

Presbyterian churches in Michigan
Churches on the National Register of Historic Places in Michigan
Greek Revival church buildings in Michigan
Churches completed in 1856
Churches in Oakland County, Michigan
Michigan State Historic Sites
National Register of Historic Places in Oakland County, Michigan
Wooden churches in Michigan